Hiroshi Kamiya (born 1975) is a Japanese voice actor.

Hiroshi Kamiya may refer to:

Hiroshi Kamiya (born 1961), Japanese shogi player
Hiroshi Kamiya (born 1968), Japanese politician